The 1992 Shell Rimula-X season was the 8th season of the franchise in the Philippine Basketball Association (PBA).

Draft picks

Championship
Shell Rimula-X took home the First Conference crown with a 4–1 series win over San Miguel Beermen. Winning coach Rino Salazar won his first title as a coach and seven-time Best Import Bobby Parks delivered the second championship to the Shell franchise, winning it "officially" this time and victory was complete.

Notable dates
April 21: Shell advances in the finals of the First Conference by scoring a 133-100 rout off San Miguel Beer in the last day of the semifinals, leaving the Beermen and the Alaska Milkmen in a playoff to dispute the other finals slot. 

June 9: Shell Rimula-X roared to a 132-114 triumph over Presto Ice Cream in their first game in the All-Filipino Conference. 

June 18: Shell escaped with a 97-96 win over Purefoods in the battle of early leaders to take solo lead in the All-Filipino Conference with three wins without a loss. 

October 8: Import Steve Colter scored 50 points in leading Shell to a 114-98 win over San Miguel in his farewell game. Colter played five games and led the Turbo Chargers to two victories. The nine-year NBA veteran will be replaced by the comebacking Kelvin Upshaw, who played for Swift last season.

Occurrences
During the Third Conference, Shell was one win away from a semifinals berth when import Kelvin Upshaw was found positive on a random drug test conducted and was banned by the PBA.  Upshaw was replaced by Jason Matthews in their last two games and Shell lost a chance to make it to the next round and were eliminated by San Miguel Beermen in the playoff game on November 8.

Roster

Transactions

Trades

Swift own the rights to Rey Cuenco when they traded Sonny Cabatu to Ginebra. Likewise Pepsi own the rights to Leo Isaac when they traded Tonichi Yturri to Ginebra

Additions

Recruited imports

References

Shell Turbo Chargers seasons
Shell